Two for the Show is a studio album by American country music artists Jack Greene and Jeannie Seely. It was released in December 1972 on Decca Records and was produced by Owen Bradley. It was pair's second studio album as a duet team. The album included two singles that became major hits on the Billboard country chart between 1971 and 1972. The album itself also reached peak positions on the Billboard country albums chart.

Background and content
Two for the Show was recorded in several sessions between September 1971 and October 1972 in sessions produced by Owen Bradley. The recording sessions were held at his studio, Bradley's Barn, which was located in Mount Juliet, Tennessee. The album consisted of 11 tracks, all of which were recorded as vocal duets between Greene and Seely. The album's sixth track, "It Just Doesn't Seem to Matter", was self-penned by Seely. Hank Cochran, Seely's then-husband, contributed to the composition of five tracks included on the album. Among these tracks was the single "What in the World Has Gone Wrong with Our Love". Two for the Show was Greene and Seely's second studio album together. In the past three years, the duo had enjoyed a successful album and road show.

Release and chart performance
Two for the Show was released in December 1972. It was originally issued as a vinyl record, with five songs on the first side and six songs on the remaining side. After spending four weeks on the Billboard Top Country Albums, the project peaked at number 36 in March 1973. The album included two singles that both became major hits on the Billboard country singles chart. The first single, "Much Oblige", was issued in December 1971 and peaked at number 15 on the Hot Country Singles chart in early 1972. The second single released was "What in the World Has Gone Wrong with Our Love", which peaked at number 19 on the same chart in October 1972.

Track listing

Personnel
All credits are adapted from the liner notes of Two for the Show.

 Owen Bradley – producer
 Jack Greene – lead vocals
 Darrell Johnson – mastering
 Jeannie Seely – lead vocals

Chart performance

Release history

References

1972 albums
Albums produced by Owen Bradley
Decca Records albums
Jack Greene albums
Jeannie Seely albums
Vocal duet albums